Bhim Prasad Dahal (29 November 1954 – 6 March 2022) was an Indian politician and writer who was a leader of Sikkim Democratic Front. Dahal served as member of the Lok Sabha representing Sikkim. He was elected to the 11th, 12th and 13th Lok Sabha.

Personal life 
Dahal was born in Timburbong, West Sikkim district.  He entered government service as a district information officer, and later became an undersecretary to the state government.  He was also an author, receiving the Sahitya Akademi Award to Nepali Writers for his novel Droha (2006).

Dahal died at Sir Thutob Namgyal Memorial Hospital in Gangtok from renal failure on 6 March 2022, at the age of 67.

References

1954 births
2022 deaths
India MPs 1996–1997
India MPs 1998–1999
India MPs 1999–2004
Indian Gorkhas
Lok Sabha members from Sikkim
People from Gyalshing district
Sikkim Democratic Front politicians

Recipients of the Sahitya Akademi Award in Nepali
Writers from Sikkim
Nepali-language writers from India